Gunnar Haarberg (28 July 1917 – 1 October 2009) was a Norwegian philologist, teacher, radio- and television personality.

Haarberg was born in Trondheim. He was a philologist, teacher, radio personality and was called Norway's first television celebrity. For a few years, he taught English at the Norwegian police academy

Haarberg was also an English teacher, and wrote several books on the subject.

Works 
The perfect guide. The right way to help tourists and talk to them, 1958
My English friends, 2. bd., Trondheim 1959
On your own in England, 1960 (2. utg. 1967)
Good evening, friends. English for beginners, 1964
E det Kvijtt eller dobbelt? (Gunnar Haarberg intervjuet av Krestjan Flatlajndet), 1965
English just for you, 1965
Engelsk grammatikk for yrkesskolen for handel og kontorarbeid, 1974

References

Further reading
H. F. Dahl m.fl.: Kinoens mørke, fjernsynets lys, 1996.

1917 births
2009 deaths
Norwegian television presenters
Norwegian philologists
Norwegian educators
Norwegian male writers
Norwegian radio personalities
People from Trondheim
20th-century philologists